Children of Fire is the third album made by the American metalcore band, Oh, Sleeper. It was released on September 6, 2011, in the United States through Solid State Records. Produced by Andreas Magnusson, the first and only single was "Endseekers" released on September 6, 2011, available on iTunes and the official music video is available on YouTube.

The album cover features the band logo, the broken pentagram with a child inside of it. It is the band's last album for almost eight years, with their next album, Bloodied/Unbowed, being released in 2019.

Concept
The concept of the album mainly focuses on the aftermath of the battle between God and Satan. It begins by continuing from the end of "The Finisher," which is the last track on their previous album Son of the Morning. "The Finisher" describes the final battle between God and Satan, and it ends in God severing the horns of Satan. Now, as the starting of the aftermath in this album, Satan's horns have fallen to the ground, and both God and Satan vanish. Now all of humanity is left wondering what happened, so the first half of the album describes everyone coming to the general consensus that God and Satan are both dead and that they have killed each other in battle; thus, now there is no fear of Hell or reward of Heaven.

The album also follows two characters, one being an overzealous religious type who feels betrayed that he had devoted his life to God and that God has abandoned him. This drives his faith to unfurl, and it reveals that he had a shallow understanding of God. The other character is his daughter, who was a profound atheist, but became proven wrong after witnessing the battle between God and Satan. This delays her questioning of Christians and why they read God and Satan in different, less violent ways than she has just seen them. Towards the end of the album, she finds a group of believers who give her all the answers to her questions. The album ends with the destruction of the world, which occurs due to everything that has happened.

Historical tracks
Oh, Sleeper wrote two songs that are based on past murders. The fourth track, "Hush Yael," narrates the story of Samir Kuntar and the murders that he committed at the age of 16. The sixth track, "Dealers of Fame," is a first-person narrative telling of the Dnepropetrovsk maniacs, who are infamous for their leaked online video that depicts their torture of an elderly man in a forest.

Track listing

Chart performance

Personnel
Oh, Sleeper
Micah Kinard - lead vocals, programming
Shane Blay - lead guitar, clean vocals
James Erwin - rhythm guitar
Nate Grady - bass guitar
Zac Mayfield - drums, percussion

Production
Andreas Lars Magnusson - producer
Scott Bradford - legal counsel
Ryan Clark - design
Chris Dowen - production assistant
Troy Glessner - mastering
Jerad Knudson - photography
Machine - mixing
Brandon Day - A&R

References

2011 albums
Oh, Sleeper albums
Solid State Records albums
Concept albums